Alejandro Alonso Yearwood Francis (born 29 April 1996) is a Panamanian professional footballer who plays as a left-back for Liga Panameña club Árabe Unido and the Panama national team.

International career
Yearwood made his debut for the Panama national team in a 0-0 friendly tie with Nicaragua on 26 February 2020.

References

External links
 
 NFT Profile

1996 births
Living people
Sportspeople from Colón, Panama
Panamanian footballers
Panama international footballers
Association football fullbacks
C.D. Árabe Unido players
Liga Panameña de Fútbol players